Aurore Mimosa Munyangaju (born as Aurore Mimosa), is a Rwandan businesswoman and politician who serves as Minister of Sports since 5 November 2019.

Early life and education
Mimosa holds a certificate in dealing simulation, awarded by ACI-Australia, an affiliate of The Financial Markets Association. She also graduated from Maastricht School of Management, in Maastricht, the Netherlands, with a Master of Business Administration, majoring in Project Management.

Career
Immediately prior to her appointment as Rwanda's Minister of Sports, Mimosa was the chief executive officer of Sonarwa Life Company, a Kigali-based insurance business. Before that, she was the CEO of African Alliance Rwanda. African Alliance is an investment banking group operating in Africa.

She has over a decade of experience in the banking industry especially in treasury management operations, and trade finance and institutional banking. She played a key role in establishing the first Securities Trading Company, as well as the first East Africa Commodity Exchange in Rwanda.

See also
 Cabinet of Rwanda

References

External links
 Website of Ministry of Sports Rwanda 

Living people
Women government ministers of Rwanda
21st-century Rwandan politicians
21st-century Rwandan women politicians
Sports ministers of Rwanda
Year of birth missing (living people)
Rwandan women in business
Maastricht School of Management alumni